Domodossola FN is a station on Line 5 of the Milan Metro which opened on 29 April 2015.

History 
The construction of the station began in July 2011, as part of the second section of the line, from Garibaldi FS to San Siro Stadio. It was opened to the public on 29 April 2015, a few days before the official opening of Expo 2015.

Station structure 
Domodossola is an underground station with two tracks served by an island platform and like all the other stations on Line 5, is wheelchair accessible.

The station allows interchange with Milano Domodossola railway station, part of the suburban railway service, even though there is no direct link. It is necessary to leave the Metro station before entering the railway station. The outdoor path is covered by a glass canopy.

Interchanges 
Near this station are located:
  Milano Domodossola railway station
  Tram stops (Domodossola FN M5, lines 1 and 19)
  Bus stops

References

Line 5 (Milan Metro) stations
Railway stations opened in 2015
2015 establishments in Italy
Railway stations in Italy opened in the 21st century